Saroos is a post-rock trio from Berlin, Germany. It consists of Florian Zimmer, Christoph Brandner and Max Punktezahl.

History

Saroos released the self-titled debut album, Saroos, on Alien Transistor in 2006.

The second album, See Me Not, was released on Anticon in the United States and on Alien Transistor elsewhere in 2010. It was produced by Odd Nosdam. The band toured Europe in promotion of the album.

Saroos released the single "Yukoma (Populous Remix)" b/w "Outrigger (feat. Jel)" on Alien Transistor in 2011. The band also toured Europe with 13 & God in the same year.

Discography

Albums
 Saroos (2006)
 See Me Not (2010)
 Return (2013)
 "Tardis" (2016)
 "OLU" (2020)

Singles
 "Yukoma (Populous Remix)" b/w "Outrigger (feat. Jel)" (2011)
 "Frequency Change feat. Sequoyah Tiger" (2021)
 "Tin & Glass feat. Ronald Lippok" (2021)

References

External links
 
 Saroos on Alien Transistor

Anticon
German post-rock groups
Anticon artists